This is a list of degree-granting universities and institutions in the Hashemite Kingdom of Jordan sorted alphabetically by the governorate to which each university belongs. Jordan has both private and public universities, many of which are supported by the government of Jordan and their respective provinces. Jordan has a fairly large number of universities for its size, and welcomes students of all nationalities.  In addition, there are 50 community colleges in Jordan that are not listed here.

Governorates
The Hashemite Kingdom of Jordan is divided into twelve governorates (muhafazah) as follows:

Ajloun
  Balqa Applied University- Ajloun College
  Ajloun National University

Amman
University of Jordan 
Al-Ahliyya Amman University
Al-Isra University
Al-Zaytoonah University of Jordan
Amman Arab University
Applied Science Private University
Arab Academy for Banking and Financial Sciences
Arab Open University
Columbia University: Amman Branch
German-Jordanian University: Jabal-Amman Branch
German-Jordanian University: Almushaqar campus/Main Campus
Hussien Technical University 
Jordan Academy for Maritime Studies
Jordan Academy of Music
Jordan Institute of Banking Studies
Jordan Media Institute
Luminus Technical University College
Middle East University
National University College of Technology
Petra University
Philadelphia University
Princess Sumaya University for Technology
Queen Noor Civil Aviation Technical College
Tafila Technical University
The World Islamic Science & Education University (W.I.S.E)
University of Jordan

Aqaba
Aqaba University of Technology (2011)
Institute of Banking Studies: Aqaba Branch
Aqaba Campus of the University of Jordan

Balqa
Balqa Applied University (Salt)

Irbid
Irbid National University
Jordan University of Science and Technology
Luminus Technical University College - LTUC
Institute of Banking Studies: Irbid Branch
Yarmouk University
Jadara University

Jerash
Jerash Private University

Kerak
Mutah University (in Mu'tah)
Balqa Applied University (kerak)

Ma'an
Al-Hussein Bin Talal University
 Balqa Applied University- College of Agriculture (in Shoubak)

Madaba

American University of Madaba (AUM):Madaba Campus
New York Institute of Technology, Madaba

Mafraq
Al al-Bayt University

Tafilah
Tafila Technical University

Zarqa
Hashemite University
Zarqa Private University

 
Universities
Jordan
Jordan